Under Thunder and Fluorescent Lights is the second and final album by Storm & Stress, released on January 18, 2000 through Touch and Go Records.

Track listing

Personnel 
Storm & Stress
Eric Emm – bass guitar
Kevin Shea – drums, percussion
Ian Williams – vocals, guitar
Production and additional personnel
Jim Black – drums on "Meet Me in the Space They Stare at Leaving Their Seat During a Show"
Dan Bodwell – bass on "O, When My Lady Comes"
Micah Gaugh – vocals on "O, When My Lady Comes"
Jim O'Rourke – engineering, recording

References

External links 
 

2000 albums
Storm & Stress albums
Touch and Go Records albums